John Edward Green may refer to:
John Green (Australian politician) (born 1945), Tasmanian politician
Johnny Green (gridiron football) (born 1937), American collegiate and professional football quarterback